The Big Springs Ranger Station is a ranger station located in Kaibab National Forest near Big Springs, Arizona. The ranger station was built by the Civilian Conservation Corps in 1934. The complex includes a house, an office building, and a barn with an attached corral; while these are the only contributing structures to the district, it also includes a number of outbuildings. U.S. Forest Service architects designed the buildings in a Bungalow style characteristic of Forest Service architectural plans during the 1930s.

The ranger station was added to the National Register of Historic Places on June 10, 1993.

See also
 Big Springs Lookout Tower, also NRHP-listed

References

United States Forest Service ranger stations
Buildings and structures in Coconino County, Arizona
Kaibab National Forest
Government buildings completed in 1934
National Register of Historic Places in Coconino County, Arizona
Park buildings and structures on the National Register of Historic Places in Arizona
Civilian Conservation Corps in Arizona
1934 establishments in Arizona